The NWA Anniversary Show is a professional wrestling event held by the National Wrestling Alliance (NWA). The first event was held in 1998 to celebrate the 50th anniversary of the 1948 founding of the NWA. The event then continued to be held annually until 2005. It has since been held periodically, with shows held in 2008, 2018, 2021, and the most recent in 2022.

Events and Results

NWA 50th Anniversary Show

The NWA 50th Anniversary Show took place on October 24, 1998 at the Hilton Hotel in Cherry Hill, New Jersey.

NWA 51st Anniversary Show

The NWA 51st Anniversary Show, subtitled "Battle of the Belts 1999", took place on September 25, 1999 at the Grady Cole Center in Charlotte, North Carolina.

NWA 52nd Anniversary Show

The NWA 52nd Anniversary Show, took place over two events, subtitled "Battle of the Belts 2000" and "Showcase of the Stars", on October 14 and 15 2000 at the Tennessee State Fairgrounds Arena in Nashville, Tennessee. In the ninth match on night two Brandon K substituted for J.B. Destiny, who was unable to appear due to travel problems.

Night one

Night two

NWA 53rd Anniversary Show

The NWA 53rd Anniversary Show, subtitled "Battle of the Belts 2001", took place on October 13, 2001 at the WrestlePlex in St. Petersburg, Florida.

NWA 54th Anniversary Show

The NWA 54th Anniversary Show, subtitled "Battle of the Belts 2002", took place on October 26, 2002 at the Memorial Coliseum in Corpus Christi, Texas.

NWA 55th Anniversary Show

The NWA 55th Anniversary Show, took place over two events on October 10 and 11 2003 at the Park Pavilion in Parkersburg, West Virginia.

Night one

Night two

NWA 56th Anniversary Show

The NWA 56th Anniversary Show took place over two events on October 15 and 17 2004 at the Ramada Malbourough Hotel in Winnipeg, Manitoba, Canada.

Night one

Night two

NWA 57th Anniversary Show

The NWA 57th Anniversary Show took place on October 8, 2005 at the Tennessee State Fairgrounds Arena in Nashville, Tennessee.

NWA 60th Anniversary Show

The NWA 60th Anniversary Show took place on June 7, 2008 at Philips Arena, now known as State Farm Arena, in Atlanta. Although it was the best-attended of all the Anniversary Show events, arena officials believed the crowd to be the smallest that the 18,000-seat venue had ever seen.

NWA 70th Anniversary Show

NWA 73rd Anniversary Show

NWA 74th Anniversary Show

Sources

References

External links

National Wrestling Alliance shows
Recurring events established in 1998
Professional wrestling anniversary shows